The Aiken Foxhounds were an independent league baseball team that existed in 2007.  The team was based in Aiken, South Carolina and played its home games at Roberto Hernandez Stadium. The club was managed by former Cleveland Indians catcher Chris Bando. A member of the South Coast League, the Foxhounds finished their lone season in 4th place of the standings.

The Foxhounds name was chosen from over 1,000 entries in a "Name the Team" online contest. The name came from the breed of dog which is a popular in the Carolinas. Around 1890, fox hunting clubs were founded in the region. Foxhounds general manager Bradley Bell also stated that "Furthermore, 'Foxhounds' is a unique name that has not been used in minor league sports. (It is) a name that affords us some creativity and flexibility in marketing the team throughout the region".

While the league and the team never played a second season, the Foxhounds were prepared to play again 2008 in the South Coast League. The league folded in late March 2008.

2007 season

References

Professional baseball teams in South Carolina
Baseball teams established in 2007
South Coast League teams
2007 establishments in South Carolina
Sports clubs disestablished in 2007
Defunct independent baseball league teams
Defunct minor league baseball teams
2007 disestablishments in South Carolina
Aiken, South Carolina
Defunct baseball teams in South Carolina
Baseball teams disestablished in 2007